Carlos Javier Delgado Rodríguez (born 22 April 1990) is a Spanish professional footballer who plays as a centre-back for Indian Super League club Odisha.

Club career

Early years and Sparta
Born in Puerto Real, Cádiz, Andalusia, Delgado joined Málaga CF's youth system at the age of 15. In early 2008, he rejected a new contract and went on trial with Eredivisie club Sparta Rotterdam, finally signing in January 2009 but failing to make a single appearance, subsequently returning to his country and joining Real Valladolid, who assigned the player to their reserves.

In summer 2010, Delgado signed with another reserve team, UD Almería B. In January of the following year, after playing only five matches in the Segunda División B, he returned to the Netherlands and Sparta on loan. He made his debut for the latter – who now competed in Eerste Divisie – on 28 January, against RBC Roosendaal (4–1 home win). On 11 February, he scored in a 3–2 away victory over FC Dordrecht.

Delgado returned to Spain in July 2011, joining Orihuela CF also in the third division.

Valencia
On 12 June 2012, Delgado signed a two-year contract with Valencia CF, being initially a part of the B team setup in the third tier. He made his debut for Mestalla on 26 August against Gimnàstic de Tarragona and, the following month, was called up to train with the main squad by manager Mauricio Pellegrino due to Ricardo Costa's injury; on the 29th, he was an unused substitute for a La Liga game against Real Zaragoza.

Delgado made his competitive debut for the Che on 2 October 2012, playing the full 90 minutes in a 2–0 home defeat of Lille OSC in the group stage of the UEFA Champions League.

Leganés
On 8 August 2014, Delgado joined CD Leganés who had recently promoted to the Segunda División. He made his debut for the club on 23 November, starting in a 1–0 away loss against CD Mirandés.

After appearing in only 13 competitive matches, Delgado was released.

Recreativo and Albacete
On 2 August 2015, Delgado signed a one-year deal with Recreativo de Huelva of the third division. On 28 June 2016 he moved to fellow league side Albacete Balompié, and achieved promotion to division two as captain.

Later career
On 16 July 2018, free agent Delgado agreed to a three-year contract with third-tier CD Castellón. One year later, he was loaned to Indian Super League franchise Odisha FC.

Delgado spent the 2021–22 season with CD Atlético Baleares in the newly-created Primera División RFEF. In June 2022 he returned to Odisha, reuniting with manager Josep Gombau. He made his official debut on 17 August, in a 6–0 rout of NorthEast United FC in the Durand Cup.

Career statistics

Club

References

External links

1990 births
Living people
Spanish footballers
Footballers from Andalusia
Association football defenders
Segunda División players
Segunda División B players
Tercera División players
Primera Federación players
Atlético Malagueño players
Real Valladolid Promesas players
UD Almería B players
Orihuela CF players
Valencia CF Mestalla footballers
Valencia CF players
CD Leganés players
Recreativo de Huelva players
Albacete Balompié players
CD Castellón footballers
CD Atlético Baleares footballers
Eerste Divisie players
Sparta Rotterdam players
Indian Super League players
Odisha FC players
Spanish expatriate footballers
Expatriate footballers in the Netherlands
Expatriate footballers in India
Spanish expatriate sportspeople in the Netherlands
Spanish expatriate sportspeople in India